Giovanni Battista Arista (born 2 Apr, 1863 in Palermo) was an Italian clergyman and auxiliary bishop for the Roman Catholic Diocese of Acireale, and for Roman Catholic Diocese of Nyssa.. He became ordained in 1888. He was appointed bishop in 1904. He died in 1920.

References

20th-century Italian Roman Catholic bishops
1863 births
1920 deaths
Clergy from Palermo